This is a list of AM and FM radio stations in Barbados. Where possible, nicknames of stations have been given alongside the frequencies.

AM station

FM stations

TV station

Other broadcasters to Barbados 

The following stations which are not based in Barbados do have significant radio coverage in Barbados.

Future Station

Paradise FM Limited applied to launch a station aimed predominantly at the Tourist and Ex-Pat market, it had hoped to be on air early 2010.

Defunct
From time to time radio stations in Barbados undergo rebranding or change formats. Some of the previous brands and formats in Barbados include.

Liberty 98.1 FM - AKA "Liberty To Set You Free" now known as The One 98.1 FM.
Rediffusion Barbados (Broadcast via cable wires) - Associated-Rediffusion. No longer in operation.
Yess FM (Yess 104.1), became Love FM 104.1, became 104.1, and now known as The Beat 104.1.
Caribbean Super Station (CSS) now known as Life FM. Caribbean Super Station (CSS) no longer broadcast in Barbados.
Voice Of Barbados (92.9) previously broadcast in the AM band at 790 kHz.

See also
Communications in Barbados
Barbadian Television stations
Amateur radio call signs of Barbados

References

External links
Telecommunications Unit - In the Ministry of Finance, Investment, Telecommunications and Energy (MFIE)
MAJOR LICENCE HOLDERS IN BARBADOS, Telecommunications Unit
BROADCASTING IN BARBADOS

 
Radio Stations
Barbados